Differential may refer to:

Mathematics
 Differential (mathematics) comprises multiple related meanings of the word, both in calculus and differential geometry, such as an infinitesimal change in the value of a function
 Differential algebra
 Differential calculus
 Differential of a function, represents a change in the linearization of a function
 Total differential is its generalization for functions of multiple variables
 Differential (infinitesimal) (e.g. dx, dy, dt etc.) are interpreted as infinitesimals
 Differential topology
  Differential (pushforward) The total derivative of a map between manifolds.
 Differential exponent, an exponent in the factorisation of the different ideal
 Differential geometry, exterior differential, or exterior derivative, is a generalization to differential forms of the notion of differential of a function on a differentiable manifold
 Differential (coboundary), in homological algebra and algebraic topology, one of the maps of a cochain complex
 Differential cryptanalysis, a pair consisting of the difference, usually computed by XOR, between two plaintexts, and the difference of the corresponding ciphertexts

Science and technology
 Differential (mechanical device), as part of a powertrain and car, the device that allows each of the driving wheels to rotate at different speeds
 Limited-slip differential
 Differential steering, the steering method used by tanks and similar tracked vehicles
 Electronic differential, an electric motor controller which substitutes its mechanical counterpart with significant advantages in electric vehicle application
 Differential signaling, in electronics, applies to a method of transmitting electronic signals over a pair of wires to reduce interference
 Differential amplifier an Electronic amplifier that amplifies signals.

Social sciences
 Semantic and structural differentials in psychology
 Quality spread differential, in finance
 Compensating differential, in labor economics

Medicine
 Differential diagnosis, the characterization of the underlying cause of pathological states based on specific tests
 White blood cell differential, the enumeration of each type of white blood cell either manually or using automated analyzers

Other
 Differential hardening, in metallurgy
 Differential rotation, in astronomy
 Differential centrifugation, in cell biology
 Differential scanning calorimetry, in materials science
 Differential signalling, in communications
 Differential GPS, in satellite navigation technology
 Differential interferometry in radar
 Differential, an extended play by The Sixth Lie
 Handicap differential, part of the calculation used in producing golf handicaps

See also
 
 
 Different (disambiguation)